Morishima (written: 森嶋 or 森島 lit. "forest island") is a Japanese surname. Notable people with the surname include:

, Japanese manga artist
, Japanese writer
, Japanese footballer
, Japanese ice hockey player
, Japanese economist, mathematician and econometrician
, Japanese professional wrestler
, Japanese mathematician
, Japanese footballer
, Japanese footballer

Japanese-language surnames